Chesterfield Football Club is an English association football club based in the Derbyshire town of Chesterfield. The current club dates from 1919, but the histories of earlier Chesterfield-based clubs are generally discussed alongside that of the current club. The first Chesterfield F.C. was founded in the mid-1860s and survived until 1881, long before league football existed. The second incarnation, which became known as Chesterfield Town F.C., was formed in 1884. Its first team joined and won the Sheffield & District League in 1891–92, and first entered the FA Cup the following season. Drawn away to Gainsborough Trinity in the first qualifying round, the score stood at 2–2 at full time; Trinity scored twice during extra time, but darkness fell before the agreed half hour was complete, so the match was ordered to be replayed. Chesterfield lost the replay 4–0. They continued in the Sheffield leagues until joining the Midland Football League in 1896. After three top-four finishes, Chesterfield were elected to the Second Division of the Football League for the 1899–1900 season. The team generally struggled in the Football League: they placed fifth in 1904–05, but followed up with four consecutive bottom-three positions. Three times they successfully applied for re-election to the League, but the fourth application failed, and Chesterfield returned to the Midland League in 1909. Despite winning the title that season, they were not accepted back into the Football League, and continued in the Midland League until competitive football was suspended for the duration of the First World War.

Chesterfield Town went into voluntary liquidation in 1915. A third club, formed to participate in the wartime competitions, failed because of financial irregularities, and when competitive football resumed, Chesterfield Council founded its own club, Chesterfield Municipal. They won the first post-war Midland League titleand were expelled from that season's FA Cup for fielding an ineligible playerbut when the football authorities made clear their opposition to municipal ownership of clubs, the council's involvement ceased and the club was renamed Chesterfield F.C. It was a founder member of the Football League Third Division North, spent much of the 1920s in the top half of that division, and won the title in 1930–31. They retained their Second Division status for just two seasons, won a further Third Division North championship in 1936, and remained in the second tier until the interruption for war and for five seasons thereafter. Consistent top-half finishes meant Chesterfield were allocated to the Third Division when the regional sections were amalgamated into Third and Fourth Divisions in 1958, but they lasted only three seasons before making their debut at the lower level.

Chesterfield were promoted as 1969–70 Fourth Division champions. In 1980–81, they entered and won the last edition of the Anglo-Scottish Cup, defeating Scottish giants Rangers 3–0 in the quarter-finals before beating Notts County in the final. Two years later, they were relegated, and came close to folding, with debts of £400,000 and only seven contracted professionals, before bouncing back to win their second Fourth Division title in 1985. Over the next 30 years, they experienced four relegations and four promotions between third and fourth tiers. Promoted via the play-offs in 1995, they came within a point of the play-offs the following season, and reached the semi-final of the FA Cup in 1996–97, in which they faced Middlesbrough of the Premier League. With 21 minutes left and Chesterfield leading 2–1, Jonathan Howard shot against the underside of the bar; the ball bounced down and then out, and referee David Elleray ruled, incorrectly, that it had not crossed the line. A minute later, he awarded a penalty to Middlesbrough for a foul that took place outside the penalty area. Middlesbrough scored, and took a 3–2 lead in extra time, but Jamie Hewitt equalised with seconds left. Chesterfield lost the replay 3–0.

In 2000–01, a nine-point deduction for financial irregularities, initially deemed too lenient by the Football League, failed to prevent Chesterfield's automatic promotion in third place, and the following year the club was taken out of administration into the ownership and control of the Chesterfield Football Supporters' Society. In the second round of the 2008–09 FA Cup, Chesterfield lost to non-league club Droylsden, but were awarded the tie when their opponents were found to have fielded an ineligible player; when Chesterfield did the same in 2014–15, they were only required to replay the tie, and won. They again won the fourth-tier title in 2010–11 and the following season won the Football League Trophy, a cup competition open to teams from the two lower divisions of the Football League, beating Swindon Town 2–0 in the final. Chesterfield won the fourth-tier championship for a league record fourth time in 2013–14, and again reached the Football League Trophy final; this time they lost 3–1 to Peterborough United. Two consecutive bottom-of-the-table finishes took them back to non-league football in 2018.

Since their first admission to the Football League in 1899, Chesterfield have spent 20 seasons in the second tier of the English football league system, 55 in the third, 25 in the fourth and 12 in non-league football. The table details the team's achievements and the top goalscorer in senior first-team competitions from their first season in the Sheffield & District League in 1891–92 to the end of the most recently completed season.

Key

Key to league record:
P – Played
W – Games won
D – Games drawn
L – Games lost
F – Goals for
A – Goals against
Pts – Points
Pos – Final position

Key to divisions:
Sheff &D – Sheffield & District League
Sheff CC – Sheffield Challenge Cup
Midland – Midland League
Div 2 – Football League Second Division
Div 3 – Football League Third Division
Div 3N – Football League Third Division North
Div 4 – Football League Fourth Division
League 1 – Football League One, EFL League One
League 2 – Football League Two, EFL League Two
Nat – National League

Key to rounds:
Prelim – Preliminary round
QR1 – First qualifying round
QR2 – Second qualifying round, etc.
Inter – Intermediate round (between qualifying rounds and rounds proper)
R1 – First round
R2 – Second round, etc.
QF – Quarter-final
SF – Semi-final
F – Final
W – Winners
(N) – Northern section of regionalised stage

Details of the abandoned 1939–40 Football League season are shown in italics and appropriately footnoted.

Seasons

Notes

References

External links
Chesterfield F.C. official website

Seasons
 
Chesterfield